Zappa Records is an American record label. The label was founded in Los Angeles in 1977 by Frank Zappa.

Catalog

References

External links
The official Frank Zappa website
 

Zappa Records albums
Discographies of American artists